Maninder Singh (born 10 May 1990) is an Indian footballer who currently plays for Pune F.C. in the I-League.

Career

Pune
Singh signed with Pune F.C. of the I-League during the summer of 2011 after spending his first professional season with JCT FC. He then made his first team debut for Pune against Sporting Clube de Goa on 28 October 2011.

Career statistics

Club
Statistics accurate as of 23 August 2012

References

Indian footballers
1990 births
Living people
I-League players
Pune FC players
JCT FC players
Footballers from Punjab, India
Association football midfielders